Sit Mamudpur is a village in Bangladesh. This village is in Tarafpur Union, Mirzapur Upazila, Tangail District. There is a High School in the Village, Sit Mamudpur High School.

References 

Villages in Tangail District
Populated places in Tangail District